is a Japanese television jidaigeki or period drama, that was broadcast in 1978 to 1979. It is the 14th in the Hissatsu series. The drama depicts Paranormal events so totally different from past Hissastu series However, the audience rating was low and broadcast period was shortened.

Plot

Cast
Atsuo Nakamura as Sensei
Etsuko Ichihara as Obasan
Shōhei Hino as Shōjyu
Akiko Wada as Waka
Ayukawa Izumi as Onemu

References

1970 Japanese television series debuts
1970s drama television series
Jidaigeki television series